Bangabandhu Bridge, also known as the Jamuna Multi-purpose Bridge ( Jomuna Bohumukhi Setu) is a bridge opened in Bangladesh in June 1998. It connects Bhuapur on the Jamuna River's east bank to Sirajganj on its west bank. It was the 11th longest bridge in the world when constructed in 1998 and at present is the 6th longest bridge in South Asia. The Jamuna River, which it spans, is one of the three major rivers of Bangladesh, and is fifth largest in the world in discharge volume.

History of construction

The river Jamuna (Brahmaputra), along with the lower stretch of the Padma (Ganges) divides Bangladesh into nearly two equal halves. Until now all road and rail communication between the two parts of the country has had to rely on time-consuming ferry services that were often disrupted because of navigability problems. The need for a bridge over the Jamuna River was felt, especially by the people living in northwestern Bangladesh, for a long time. This perceived need did not go unnoticed by the policy makers.

Jamuna Multipurpose Bridge was constructed by Hyundai Heavy Industries at a cost of $696 million. But the whole bridge project costed 1.24 billion dollar for unknown reason. The cost was shared by IDA, ADB, OECD, and the government of Bangladesh. Of the total, IDA, ADB and OECD supplied $200 million each through a loan with 1% nominal interest, and the remaining $96 million was borne by Bangladesh.

Connected to the bridge are east and west approach viaducts each with 12 spans of 10 metre length and transition spans of 8 metres. The total width of the bridge deck is 18.5 metres.

The river crossing was designed to carry a dual two-lane carriageway, a dual gauge (broad and metre) railway, a high voltage (230 kV) electrical interconnector, telecommunication cables and a 750 mm diameter high pressure natural gas pipeline. The carriageways are 6.315 metres wide separated by a 0.57 metre width central barrier; the rail track is along the north side of the deck. On the main bridge, electrical interconnector pylons are positioned on brackets cantilevered from the north side of the deck. Telecommunication ducts run through the box girder deck and the gas pipeline is under the south cantilever of the box section. The bridge has been built by Hyundai Engineering and Construction (Korea) as a 'design and build' contract. TY Lin Assoc. of San Francisco carried out the design as a sub-contractor for Hyundai. The approach roads were constructed by Samwhan Corporation (Korea).

Specifications

Sub-structure

The bridge is supported on tubular steel piles, driven into the river bed. Sand was removed from within the piles by airlifting and replaced with concrete. Out of the 50 piers, 21 piers are supported on groups of three piles (each of 2.5 m diameter) and 29 piers on groups of two piles (each of 3.15 diameter). The driving of 121 piles started on October 15, 1995, and was completed in July 1996.

The pier stems are founded on concrete pilecaps, whose shells were precast and infilled with in-situ reinforced concrete. The reinforced concrete pier stems support pierheads which contain bearings and seismic devices. These allow movement of the deck under normal loading conditions but lock in the event of an earthquake to limit overall seismic loads through the structure and minimise damage.

Superstructure

The main bridge deck is a multi-span precast prestressed concrete segmental structure, constructed by the balanced cantilever method.  Each cantilever has 12 segments (each 4 m long), joined to a pierhead unit (2 m long) at each pier and by an in-situ stitch at mid span. The deck is internally prestressed and of single box section. The depth of the box varies between 6.5 metres at the piers to 3.25 metres at mid-span. An expansion joint is provided every 7 spans by means of a hinge segment at approximately quarter span. The segments were precast and erected using a two-span erection gantry.

Gauge
The Bangabandhu Bridge carries a dual broad and metre gauge railway track. It also carries pylons for a powerline. The extension of the bridge costed 134 million$ extra later on.

Litigation
Within a decade of inauguration, cracks were detected on the bridge prompting the authorities to impose limits on the number of vehicles allowed to cross at any given time. By early 2008, the government announced its intention to sue the South Korean conglomerate Hyundai for flawed design.

Repair, strengthening and health monitoring
During March 2006-June 2006, Bangladesh University of Engineering and Technology experts worked to identify the causes of extensive cracking of prestressed concrete deck, web and pear head units of almost all segments of the Bridge. The cracks were identified primarily on the longitudinal direction of the bridge deck with some secondary crackings also in the transverse
direction. In the analytical investigation, three dimensional model of the bridge was developed in finite elements methods.

Repair and strengthening effort included the replacement of modular expansion joints, strengthening the deck with carbon fiber reinforced polymer strips, web-deck connection improvement by carbon fiber reinforced fabrics and also sealing of non-structural cracks. These were conducted in phases. After repair and strengthening, performance of the bridge monitored. Health monitoring campaign was conducted by Bangladesh University of Engineering and Technology for first few years to take reference measurements.

See also 

 List of bridges on Brahmaputra River
 List of bridges
 List of bridges by length
 List of road-rail bridges
 Jamuna River
 Jamuna Cantonment
 98th Composite Brigade (Bangladesh)
 Transport in Bangladesh
 Railway stations in Bangladesh
 Padma Bridge, a similar bridge to be completed on the Padma River

Notes

External links
 Bangladesh Bridge Authority.

Railway bridges in Bangladesh
Road bridges in Bangladesh
Bridges completed in 1998
Road-rail bridges
Toll bridges in Bangladesh
Memorials to Sheikh Mujibur Rahman
Bridges over the Brahmaputra River
1998 establishments in Bangladesh